The shallot is a botanical variety (a cultivar) of the onion. Until 2010, the (French red) shallot was classified as a separate species, Allium ascalonicum. The taxon was synonymized with Allium cepa (the common onion) in 2010, as the difference was too small to justify a separate species. 

As part of the onion genus Allium, its close relatives include garlic, scallions, leeks, chives, and the Chinese onion.

Names 

The name "shallot" comes from Ashkelon, an ancient Canaanite city, where Classical-era Greeks believed shallots originated.

The term shallot is usually applied to the French red shallot (Allium cepa var. aggregatum, or the A. cepa Aggregatum Group). It is also used for the Persian shallot or musir (A. stipitatum) from the Zagros Mountains in Iran and Iraq, and the French gray shallot (Allium oschaninii) which is also known as griselle or "true shallot"; it grows wild from Central to Southwest Asia. The name shallot is also used for a scallion in New South Wales, Australia and among English-speaking people in Quebec while the term French shallot refers to the plant referred to on this page. In most English-speaking nations, the name is pronounced with the emphasis on the last syllable, sha-lot, while the emphasis is commonly made on the first syllable, shall-ət, in the United States.

The term eschalot, derived from the French word échalote, can also be used to refer to the shallot.

Description and cultivation 

Like garlic, shallots are formed in clusters of offsets with a head composed of multiple cloves. The skin colour of shallots can vary from golden brown to gray to rose red, and their off-white flesh is usually tinged with green or magenta.

Shallots are extensively cultivated for culinary uses, propagated by offsets. In some regions ("long-season areas"), the offsets are usually planted in autumn (September or October in the Northern Hemisphere). In some other regions, the suggested planting time for the principal crop is early spring (typically in February or the beginning of March in the Northern Hemisphere).

In planting, the tops of the bulbs should be kept a little above ground, and the soil surrounding the bulbs is often drawn away when the roots have taken hold. They come to maturity in summer, although fresh shallots can now be found year-round in supermarkets. Shallots should not be planted on ground recently manured. Shallots suffer damage from leek moth larvae, which mine into the leaves or bulbs of the plant.

Nutrition
A raw shallot is 80% water, 17% carbohydrates, 2.5% protein and contains negligible fat (table). No other micronutrients are in significant content.

Culinary uses 
Shallots are used in cooking. They may be pickled. Finely-sliced deep-fried shallots are used as a condiment in Asian cuisine, often served with porridge . As a species of Allium, shallots taste somewhat like a common onion, but have a milder flavor.  Like onions, when sliced, raw shallots release substances that irritate the human eye, resulting in production of tears.

Fresh shallots can be stored in a cool, dry area (0 to 4 °C, 32 to 40 °F, 60 to 70% RH) for six months or longer. Chopped, dried shallots are available.

Europe 
In Europe, the Pikant, Atlas, and Ed's Red types of shallots are the most common.

Asia 

Shallots are the traditional choice for many dishes in Sri Lankan cuisine, including pol sambola, lunu miris and many meat, fish and vegetable dishes.

In most Indian cuisines, the distinction between onions and shallots is weak; larger varieties of shallot are sometimes confused with small red onions and used interchangeably. Indeed, most parts of India use the regional name for onion interchangeably with shallot (Maharashtra, for instance, where both are called kanda). The southern regions of India distinguish shallots from onions in recipes more often, especially the much loved tiny varieties (about the width of a finger); these are widely used in curries and different types of sambar, a lentil-based dish. Shallots pickled in red vinegar are common in many Indian restaurants, served along with sauces and papad on the condiments tray. Indians also use it  as a home remedy for sore throats, mixed with jaggery or sugar. In Nepal, shallots are used as one of the ingredients for making momo. 

In Kashmir shallots are widely used in preparation of Wazwan Kashmiri cuisine, as they add distinct flavor and prevent curry from becoming black, which is common with onions.

In Iran shallots are used in various ways, the most common being grated shallot mixed into dense yogurt, a combination served in almost every restaurant when one orders grills or kebabs. Shallots are also used to make different types of torshi (ترشی), a sour Iranian side dish consisting of a variety of vegetables under vinegar, eaten with main dishes in small quantities. Shallot is also pickled—called shour (شور) in Persian—along with other vegetables to be served as torshi.

In Southeast Asian cuisines, such as those of Indonesia, Vietnam, Thailand, Cambodia, Malaysia, Philippines, Singapore and Brunei, both shallots and garlic are often used as elementary spices. Raw shallots can also accompany cucumbers when pickled in mild vinegar solution. They are also often chopped finely, then fried until golden brown, resulting in tiny crispy shallot chips called bawang goreng (fried shallots) in Indonesian, which can be bought ready-made from groceries and supermarkets. Shallots enhance the flavor of many Southeast Asian dishes, such as fried rice variants. Crispy shallot chips are also used in southern Chinese cuisine. In Indonesia, shallots are sometimes made into pickles that are added to several traditional foods; the pickles' sourness is thought to increase the appetite. In the southern Philippines, shallot bulbs and leaves are used to make the popular spicy Maranao condiment called palapa, which is used in the dish Piaparan.

The tubular green leaves of the plant can also be eaten and are very similar to the leaves of spring onions and chives.

Gallery

See also 
 Scallion

References

External links 
 
 

Allium
Asian vegetables
Onions
Perennial vegetables
Root vegetables
Taxa named by Carl Linnaeus
Miniature versions of vegetables